Juan Torruella Jr. (born 11 June 1957) is a Puerto Rican sailor. He competed in the Tornado event at the 1984 Summer Olympics, finishing in 18th place with his partner, Enrique Díaz.

References

External links
 

1957 births
Living people
Puerto Rican male sailors (sport)
Olympic sailors of Puerto Rico
Sailors at the 1984 Summer Olympics – Tornado
Place of birth missing (living people)
20th-century Puerto Rican people